Avengers Assemble is an animated television series based on the comic book super hero team known as the Avengers. It premiered on Disney XD on May 26, 2013.

On June 1, 2015, the series was renewed for a third season titled Avengers: Ultron Revolution, which premiered on Disney XD on March 13, 2016. It was renewed for a fourth season which is entitled Avengers: Secret Wars, and then a fifth and final season entitled Avengers: Black Panther's Quest.

Series overview

Episodes

Season 1 (2013–14)
The first season focuses on the Avengers reuniting after some time to defeat Red Skull and his newly formed team The Cabal, which consists of the Avengers' most powerful enemies, along with the help of new teenage S.H.I.E.L.D. recruit Sam Wilson (alias Falcon).

Season 2 (2014–15)
On July 26, 2014, the series was renewed for a second season; The first half of the second season deals with the team facing Thanos, as he competes with them to obtain the Infinity Stones, followed by a five-episode arc detailing the return of Ultron, who plans to exterminate the human race. The rest of the season details the debut of the Squadron Supreme and their confrontation with the Avengers. The last two episodes detail the escape of Thanos by the Black Order and their attack on Earth.

Season 3: Ultron Revolution (2016–17)
Ultron returns after his apparent demise and seeks revenge on the Avengers. The Avengers must defeat him as well as new threats like Baron Zemo's Masters of Evil and Kang the Conqueror. Vision, Black Panther, Captain Marvel, and Ms. Marvel make appearances in this season. The storyline features an adaptation of the Civil War comics storyline. Season three premiered on Disney XD on March 13, 2016.

Season 4: Secret Wars (2017–18)
This season deals with the Avengers being scattered across time and space by a new incarnation of the Cabal as Black Panther assembles another incarnation of the Avengers to find them in time to save the universe.

Season 5: Black Panther's Quest (2018–19)
On July 22, 2017, Avengers Assemble was renewed for a fifth and final season titled Avengers: Black Panther's Quest centering around Black Panther, and featuring a new type of animation. However, unlike the previous seasons which shared continuity with Ultimate Spider-Man, this one shares continuity with the 2017 Spider-Man animated series.

Shorts (2017)

References

Lists of Marvel Comics animated series episodes
Lists of American children's animated television series episodes
Avengers (comics) lists
Avengers (comics) television series